W.A.K.O. World Championships 1999 were the joint twelfth world kickboxing championships (the other was held the same year in Bishkek, Kyrgyzstan) hosted by the W.A.K.O. organization.  It was the fifth championships (world and European) to be held in Italy and was open to amateur men and women from fifty countries across the world.

There were five categories available at Caorle, much more than at the previous European championships.  The categories on offer included; Full-Contact, Thai-Boxing (men only), Light-Contact, Semi-Contact and Musical Forms.  By the end of the championships Belarus was the top nation, just about shading second place Russia due to her incredible record in Thai-boxing, while Italy came in third.  The event was held in Caorle, Italy in November, 1999.

Participating nations

There were fifty nations from five continents across the world participating at the 1999 W.A.K.O. World Championships in Caorle:

Full-Contact

Full-Contact is a form of kickboxing where fights are won primarily by point's decision or referee stoppage, with kicks and punches allowed above the waist, although unlike professional kickboxing, head and body protection is compulsory - more detail on Full-Contact rules are available on the W.A.K.O. website.  At Caorle the men had twelve weight divisions ranging from 51 kg/112.2 lbs to over 91 kg/+200.2 lbs, while the women had seven (one more than at Leverkusen) ranging from 48 kg/105.6 lbs to over 70 kg/+143 lbs, with an extra weight class being added (+70 kg).  Notable winners in this category included Mariusz Cieśliński who won his third W.A.K.O. world championship gold medal, Aleksandr Povetkin who would go to achieve greater renown as a pro boxer, and Natascha Ragosina who would later become a multiple world champion in women's boxing.  By the end of the championships Russia were easily the dominant nation in Full-Contact, winning five gold medals, three silver and three bronze in total.

Men's Full-Contact Kickboxing Medals Table

Women's Full-Contact Kickboxing Medals Table

Thai-Boxing

The most physical type of kickboxing available at W.A.K.O. championships, Thai-boxing (more commonly known as Muay Thai) allows the contestants to kick, punch, use elbows and knees in an attempt to win their matches – often by a point’s decision or via a referee stoppage.  Unlike the professional version, W.A.K.O. amateur events enforce the wearing of head, body and leg protection by the competitors.  In Caorle only men were allowed to participate in Thai-boxing, with twelve weight classes ranging from 51 kg/112.2 lbs to over 91 kg/+200.2 lbs.  Notable winners in the style included future pro world champions Vasily Shish, Dmitry Shakuta and Vitali Akhramenko, with their nation Belarus being by far the strongest nation in Thai-boxing, winning eight gold and two bronze medals.  Even more incredible was the fact that seven of these winners all trained together at the Kick Fighter Gym in Minsk.

Men's Thai-Boxing Medals Table

Light-Contact

Light-Contact is a form of kickboxing that is less physical than Full-Contact but more so than Semi-Contact and is often seen as a transition between the two.  Contestants score points on the basis of speed and technique over brute force although stoppages can occur, although as with other amateur forms head and body protection must be worn - more detail on Light-Contact rules can be found on the official W.A.K.O. website.  The men had nine weight divisions ranging from 57 kg/125.4 lbs to over 94 kg/+206.8 lbs, with several new weight divisions at the top end of the scale, while the women had five ranging from 50 kg/110 lbs to over 65 kg/143 lbs.  Not exactly full of recognizable names, the most notable winners in this category were Klaus Wilkinson and Boris Zalyotkin in the men's both having won gold at the last European championships, and in the women's, Rita Pesuth who won her second gold medal at Caorle, having also won in Semi-Contact.  Poland were the top nation in Light-Contact winning three gold, three silver and four bronze medals.

Men's Light-Contact Kickboxing Medals Table

Women's Light-Contact Kickboxing Medals Table

Semi-Contact

Semi-Contact is a form of kickboxing in which fights were won by points given due to technique, skill and speed, with physical force limited and as with other forms of amateur kickboxing, head and body protection is worn - more information on Semi-Contact can be found on the W.A.K.O. website.  The men had eight weight divisions ranging from 57 kg/125.4 lbs to over 94 kg/+206.8 lbs while the women had five ranging from 50 kg/110 lbs to over 65 kg/143 lbs.  The most notable winner was Rita Pesuth who also won gold at the same event in Light-Contact making her a double winner.  Italy was the top country in the style, winning six golds and four bronzes.

Men's Semi-Contact Kickboxing Medals Table

Women's Semi-Contact Kickboxing Medals Table

Musical Forms

Musical Forms is a non-physical competition which sees the contestants fighting against imaginary foes using Martial Arts techniques - more information on the style can be found on the W.A.K.O. website.  The men and women competed in four different styles explained below:

Hard Styles – coming from Karate and Taekwondo. 
Soft Styles – coming from Kung Fu and Wu-Sha. 
Hard Styles with Weapons – using weapons such as Kama, Sai, Tonfa, Nunchaku, Bō, Katana. 
Soft Styles with Weapons - using weapons such as Naginata, Nunchaku, Tai Chi Chuan Sword, Whip Chain.

The most notable winners were Olga Valentinova who was a double winner in Musical Forms and Alexei Pekarchik who also won gold in Thai-boxing.  By the end of the championships United States were the top nation with four golds, one silver and two bronze medals.

Men's Musical Forms Medals Table

Women's Musical Forms Medals Table

Overall Medals Standing (Top 5)

See also
List of WAKO Amateur World Championships
List of WAKO Amateur European Championships

References

External links
 WAKO World Association of Kickboxing Organizations Official Site

WAKO Amateur World Championships events
Kickboxing in Italy
1999 in kickboxing
Sport in Venice